John (Jack) Hibberd (1931 – May 15, 1997) was a Canadian politician and medical doctor, who represented the electoral district of Whitehorse South Centre in the Yukon Territorial Council and the Legislative Assembly of Yukon from 1974 to 1981.

Born and raised in Vancouver, British Columbia, he was educated as a surgeon, and later moved to Yukon to accept a position at Whitehorse General Hospital.

First elected to the territorial council in 1974, during his term he served on the executive committee as minister of consumer and corporate affairs and natural resources.

When territorial political parties were created for the 1978 election he joined the Yukon Progressive Conservative Party. He was reelected to the new legislative assembly in 1978.

Hibberd resigned his seat in the legislature on April 15, 1981, after accepting a position as a surgical consultant with a hospital in British Columbia. He was succeeded in a by-election by Roger Kimmerly of the Yukon New Democratic Party, resulting in the NDP overtaking the Yukon Liberal Party in seats and supplanting them as the Official Opposition.

He died on May 15, 1997 in Penticton, British Columbia.

References

1931 births
1997 deaths
Canadian surgeons
Members of the Yukon Territorial Council
Yukon Party MLAs
Politicians from Whitehorse
Politicians from Vancouver
20th-century surgeons